Demons of the Deep is a single-player roleplaying gamebook written by Steve Jackson (the American game-designer, rather than the series co-creator), illustrated by Duncan Smith and originally published in 1986 by Puffin Books. It forms part of Steve Jackson and Ian Livingstone's Fighting Fantasy series. It is the 19th in the series in the original Puffin series. There are currently no announced plans to republish the book as part of the modern Wizard series.

Demons of the Deep contains many successful endings, though some are 'more successful' than others.

Story
Demons of the Deep is the only gamebook of those that the American Steve Jackson wrote that follows a traditional linear design. In the gamebook, the reader takes on the role of the first mate of the merchant ship Sunfish.  Unfortunately, before the adventure even begins, the pirate ship Troll strikes.  The entire crew, save for the main character, are slain.  Although the protagonist is merely knocked unconscious, waking grants little respite, as a quick walk off the stern of the ship follows. The player sinks into the sea but, thanks to magic, does not drown, beginning an adventure in an ancient domain sunken beneath the waves. The player-character must collect black pearls and learn a spell to form skeletons from them, then use these to attack and defeat the pirate crew of the Troll.

The book takes place almost entirely underwater, in Atlantis, a sunken continent located west of Allansia.

References
 
 
 

1986 fiction books
Fighting Fantasy gamebooks
Books by Steve Jackson (American game designer)

pt:Demônios das Profundezas